{{DISPLAYTITLE:C5H14N2}}
The molecular formula C5H14N2 (molar mass: 102.17 g/mol, exact mass: 102.1157 u) may refer to:

 Cadaverine
 Dimethylaminopropylamine (DMAPA)
 N,N′-Dimethyl-1,3-propanediamine (DMPA)